The 103rd United States Congress began on January 3, 1993. There were ten new senators (five Democrats, five Republicans) and 108 new representatives (61 Democrats, 47 Republicans), as well as two new delegates (both Democrats), at the start of the first session. Additionally, four senators (one Democrat, three Republicans) and eight representatives (three Democrats, five Republicans) took office on various dates in order to fill vacancies during the 103rd Congress before it ended on January 3, 1995.

Due to redistricting after the 1990 census, 27 representatives were elected from newly established congressional districts.

Senate

Took office January 3, 1993

Took office during the 103rd Congress

House of Representatives

Took office January 3, 1993

Non-voting members

Took office during the 103rd Congress

See also 
List of United States senators in the 103rd Congress
List of members of the United States House of Representatives in the 103rd Congress by seniority

Notes

References 

103rd United States Congress
103